Drini FK 2004 is an Albanian football club based in Dibër. The club currently compete in the Kategoria e Tretë, the fourth tier of football in Albania.

References

Football clubs in Albania
Association football clubs established in 2004
Dibër (municipality)
2004 establishments in Albania
Albanian Third Division clubs